The following is a list of health ministers of Jamaica since adult suffrage (1944).

 Rose Leon (1953–1955)
 C. L. A. Stuart (1955–1959)
 Ivan Lloyd (1959–1962)
 Herbert Eldemire (1962–1972)
 Kenneth McNeill (1972–1977)
 Douglas Manley (1977–1980)
 Kenneth Baugh (1980–1989)
 Easton Douglas (1989–1993)
 Desmond Leakey (1993–1995)
 Peter Phillips (1995–1997)
 John Junor (1998–2006)
 Horace Dalley (2006–2007)
 Rudyard Spencer (2007–2012)
 Fenton Ferguson (2012–2015)
 Horace Dalley (2015–2016)
 Christopher Tufton (2016–present)

See also
 Cabinet of Jamaica
 Ministries and Agencies of the Jamaican Government

References

Health
Ministers of Health of Jamaica